Brian Arthur Robert White (5 May 1957 – 5 July 2016) was a British Labour politician. He served as Member of Parliament (MP) for North East Milton Keynes from the 1997 general election, but lost his seat in 2005.

Early life
He attended the Methodist College Belfast grammar school in Belfast.

He worked for HM Customs and Excise in Southend-on-Sea on the design of the VAT accounting system, then became an IT consultant, working in the US, Finland and Canada, and for Abbey National until 1997.

Political career

Parliament
White was first elected to Parliament when Labour returned to power at the 1997 general election with a 240-vote majority, when he overturned the Conservative Peter Butler's majority of 14,000 obtained at the previous election.

He was returned at the 2001 election with a slightly increased majority of 1,829, but at the 2005 election, he lost his seat to the Conservative candidate Mark Lancaster whose 1,665 majority represented a 3.6% swing.

Local government
Before his election to Parliament in 1997, White had been a Labour member of Buckinghamshire County Council, Deputy Leader of Milton Keynes Council, and Secretary of the Local Government Association Labour Group. He had joined the local council in 1987 but resigned to take his seat in Parliament.

In the local elections of May 2007, he was elected to Milton Keynes Council as a member for Stantonbury. He was re-elected in May 2011 and May 2014. He served as Mayor of Milton Keynes for a year from May 2013.

Other
He was a past Chair of the National Energy Foundation, Chair of United Sustainable Energy Agency and was on the Board of the Renewable Fuels Agency. He was a key figure in establishing Careers-Action a charity formed to help management and professional level job seekers with job search training, information, resources and support.

Personal life
He married Leena Lindholm on 4 July 1984 in Finland. He had two stepsons.

In late June 2016, White was diagnosed with an incurable cancer of the oesophagus, which had metastasised. He died in Milton Keynes hospital on 5 July 2016. He was 59.

References

External links 
 
 His website
 TheyWorkForYou.com - Brian White
 Stantonbury Ward - MK Council

1957 births
2016 deaths
Labour Party (UK) MPs for English constituencies
UK MPs 1997–2001
UK MPs 2001–2005
Politicians from Belfast
People educated at Methodist College Belfast
Politics of Milton Keynes
Councillors in Buckinghamshire
Members of Buckinghamshire County Council
Deaths from cancer in England
Mayors of places in Buckinghamshire
Deaths from esophageal cancer